The Lord High Admiral is a Grade II* listed former public house at 43 Vauxhall Bridge Road, Pimlico, London.

English Heritage note that it is attached to Charlwood House (also Grade II* listed). The design is as the result of a competition won in 1961 by John Darbourne. The structure was built in 1964–67, and the interior fitted out 1968–69. The architects were John Darbourne and Geoffrey Darke, Darbourne & Darke. It was later renamed as the Pimlico Beer Garden before becoming an Argentinian restaurant.

References

External links

Grade II* listed buildings in the City of Westminster
Grade II* listed pubs in the City of Westminster
Commercial buildings completed in 1969
Pimlico
Former pubs in London